Jordan Marsh Co. v. Commissioner, 269 F.2d 453 (2d Cir. 1959) was a United States income tax case decided by the Second Circuit.

Background

Facts

Petitioner Jordan Marsh & Company conveyed the fee of two parcels on which it operated a department store in Boston. In return, petitioner received a cash payment which represented the fair market value of the properties. Petitioner also received long-term leases of the same properties, with a conditional option to renew.

Tax return

Petitioner claimed the transaction was a sale under (a) and sought a deduction.

The commissioner disallowed the deduction, determining that the transaction represented an exchange of property for other property of like kind.

Tax court

The tax court affirmed—upheld the deficiency assessment for income and excess profits tax against petitioner due to the disallowance of a deduction taken pursuant to 26 U.S.C.S. § 112(a).

Opinion of the court
The court reversed the judgment of the tax court because the transaction had to be classified as a sale since petitioner received cash equal to the full value of the properties conveyed along with the long-term leases of the properties.

The court determined that petitioner did more than just make a change in the form of its ownership. By the transaction, petitioner's capital invested in the real estate had been completely liquidated for cash to an amount fully equal to the value of the fee. Because petitioner received cash for the full value of the property conveyed, the court held the transaction had to be classified as a sale. Therefore, the court reversed the judgment of the tax court.

See also
 Alderson v. Commissioner

References

External links

United States Court of Appeals for the Second Circuit cases
United States taxation and revenue case law
1959 in United States case law
Economic history of Boston